The RMS Walmer Castle was a Royal Mail Ship of the Union-Castle Line in service between London, England and Cape Town, South Africa between 1902 and 1930.  She was the second of three ships by this name.  Her service was interrupted in 1917 when she was requisitioned by the government to serve as a troop transport, transporting troops from South Africa and later in the North Atlantic, painted in a camouflaged dazzle scheme.  In 1919, she made two voyages between Liverpool and New York before returning to her mail run.

Among her notable passengers were poet Rudyard Kipling and politician Lord Gladstone, the first Governor General of South Africa. Kipling traveled the Union-Castle line twenty times.  Lord Alfred Milner and his wife Violet traveled from England to South Africa aboard the Walmer Castle in 1924.

She was retired and replaced by the refrigerated ship Winchester Castle in 1930.

Footnotes

References
 Marlowe, John, Milner: Apostle of Empire, London: Hamish Hamilton, 1976
 O'Brien, Terence, "Milner: Viscount Milner of St. James's and Cape Town", London: Constable, 1979
 Cecil, Hugh & Mirabel, Imperial Marriage, London: Murray, 2002
 Hodson, Norman, The Race to the Cape: A Story of the Union-Castle Line, 1857-1977, Hampshire: Navigator, 1995

External links
 History of the ship: Link
 A Short video: Link
 The Castle Line Atlas of South Africa, London: Currie, 1895

1901 ships